The following list is a discography of production by Skread, a French record producer and musician. It includes a list of songs produced, co-produced and remixed by year, artist, album and title.

2004

Booba – Panthéon
 01. "Tallac"
 07. "Baby" (featuring Nessbeal)

Nysay – L'asphaltape
 03. "Le biz a changé"
 07. "La course à l'argent"
 13. "Pow"

Nysay – Starting Blocks
 04. "Anacronik"
 12. "Maro"
 13. "Black Coko"
 15. "H.10.STREEKT"
 24. "Doums Layzi" (featuring Furax)

Street Lourd – Street Lourd Hall Stars
 02. "Haute criminologie" (featuring Rim'K and Lino)
 03. "Du 93 au 94" (featuring Kool Shen and Serum)
 05. "La Hass" (featuring Intouchable, Kamelancien and Rohff)
 09. "Parce que le monde" (featuring Diam's and Kennedy)
 19. "Le sang des tours" (featuring Dicidens)
 20. "En mode 2" (featuring Rohff)

2005

Booba – Autopsie, Vol. 1
CD 2
 14. "Rap de paria" (Nessbeal)

Brasco and El Matador – Bombattak MC's
 02. "Notre revanche" (El Matador featuring Brasco)
 03. "Ma zermi" (Brasco)
 04. "C'est la merde" (El Matador)
 05. "Soldats" (El Matador featuring Brasco and Gringe)
 08. "Rat du macadam" (Gringe)
 15. "13 NRV" (El Matador)
 16. "Big Ben" (Brasco)
 18. "Le seul, l'unique" (Brasco)
 19. "Notre revanche" (El Matador featuring Le Rat Luciano)

IV My People – Mission
 13. "Ma Jeunesse"

LIM – Enfant du ghetto
 05. "À ce qu'il paraît" (featuring Mo'Vez Lang)

Lino – Paradis assassiné
 02. "Stress"
 11. "Macadam Philosophie"

Rohff – Au-delà de mes limites
CD 1
 08. "La Hass (version 2)"

CD 2
 04. "En mode 2"

Sinik – La main sur le cœur
 02. "2 victimes / 1 coupable"

2006

Diam's – Dans ma bulle
 08. "Dans ma bulle"
 15. "Petite banlieusarde"

DJ Whoo Kid and DJ Cut Killer – Mixtape Evolution
 08. "Bomayé Music" (Youssoupha)
 16. "Bienvenue à Massilia" (Psy 4 de la Rime)

Hostile Records – Hostile 2006
 16. "Emmuré Vivant" (Nessbeal)

Nessbeal – La mélodie des briques
 01. "Intro"
 02. "Rap de Tess"
 04. "La mélodie des briques"
 05. "Loin du rivage"
 06. "10,000 Questions"
 07. "Princesse au regard triste"
 12. "Candidat au crime"
 13. "Peur d'aimer"
 14. "Funèste écriture"
 15. "Chute libre" (featuring Dicidens)

Nysay – Au pied du mur
CD 1
 15. "Vote ou crève"

CD 2
 03. "Le biz a changé"
 07. "La course à l'argent"
 08. "États des lieux"
 12. "Ma jeunesse"
 15. "Pow"

2007

El Matador – Parti de rien
 05. "Mets-toi bien"
 06. "Le péril jeune"
 07. "C'est de la merde"

Passi – Evolution
 13. "Romeo & Juliet 2000"

Salif – Boulogne Boy
 01. "Yoyo"

2008

Nessbeal – Rois sans couronne
 01. "Rimes instinctives"
 02. "Le loup dans la bergerie"
 03. "Réalité française"
 04. "H.L.M. Bonnie et Clyde"
 06. "On aime ça"
 09. "Autopsie d'une tragédie"
 12. "Les anges aux visages sales"
 14. "Clown triste"
 15. "Casablanca"

Salif – Prolongations
CD 2
 05. "Amateur de Brako"
 07. "Ma jeunesse"
 22. "Yoyo"

2009

Frenesik Industry – Maghreb United
 08. "Dicton du Bled" (Rim'K and Diam's)

Orelsan – Perdu d'avance
 01. "Étoiles invisibles"
 02. "Changement"
 03. "Soirée ratée"
 04. "Différent"
 05. "No Life"
 06. "Pour le pire"
 07. "Perdu d'avance"
 08. "Gros poissons dans une petite mare"
 09. "Logo dans le ciel"
 10. "50 pour cent"
 11. "Jimmy Punchline"
 12. "Entre bien et mal" (featuring Gringe)
 13. "Courez Courez"
 14. "Peur de l'échec" (featuring Ron "Bumblefoot" Thal)

Taipan – Punchliner
 27. "No Life" (remix) (featuring Nessbeal and Orelsan)

2010

Isleym – Avec le temps
 02. "À chaque jour suffit sa peine" (remix)

Nessbeal – NE2S
 02. "À chaque jour suffit sa peine"
 03. "Ça bouge pas"
 04. "After"
 05. "Au bout de la route" (featuring La Fouine)
 06. "Papa instable"
 07. "La traversée du désert"
 08. "I.L.S." (featuring Bradley Jones)
 09. "Ma grosse" (featuring Orelsan)
 10. "Je vole au-dessus de ça" (featuring Isleym)
 13. "Balles dans le pied"
 14. "Poussière d'empire"

2011

Nessbeal – Sélection naturelle
 05. "J'suis un salaud"
 08. "La nébuleuse des aigles" (featuring Isleym)
 10. "Soldat"
 13. "La naissance du mal"
 14. "Sélection naturelle"

Orelsan – Le chant des sirènes
 01. "RaelSan"
 02. "Le chant des sirènes"
 03. "Plus rien ne m'étonne"
 05. "Double vie"
 06. "Finir mal"
 07. "Si seul"
 08. "Des trous dans la tête"
 11. "1990"
 12. "2010"
 13. "La morale" (co-produced with Félipé Saldivia)
 15. "Suicide social"
 16. "Elle viendra quand même"

2013

Casseurs Flowters – Orelsan et Gringe sont les Casseurs Flowters
 02. "15h02 – Regarde comme il fait beau (dehors)" (co-produced with Fred Savio)
 03. "15h45 – Stupide ¡ Stupide ¡ Stupide ¡"
 04. "16h00 – Tu m'dois d'l'oseille"
 06. "17h04 – Prends des pièces"
 07. "18h30 – Bloqué"
 09. "20h08 – Dans la place pour être"
 11. "22h31 – Fais les backs" (co-produced with DJ Pone)
 13. "01h16 – Les putes et moi" (co-produced with Vizioz)
 14. "01h25 – Johnny Galoche"
 15. "01h47 – Change de Pote"
 17. "04h41 – Greenje et Orselane"
 18. "06h16 – Des histoires à raconter"

2014

Disiz – Transe-lucide
 02. "Banlieusard Syndrome"

Isleym – Où ça nous mène
 01. "Intro"
 04. "Ange gardien"
 06. "Grande sœur" (featuring Awa Imani)
 10. "Petit bateau"
 11. "Celles et ceux" (co-produced with Dany Synthé)
 15. "Partir"

Redouanne Harjane – The Loser (single)
 01. "The Loser"

2015

Casseurs Flowters – Comment c'est loin
 01. "Nouvelle journée"
 02. "Au bout du compte"
 03. "À l'heure où je me couche"
 04. "Quand ton père t'engueule"
 05. "En boucle"
 06. "Faut qu'on rentre bosser"
 07. "Freestyle Radio Phoenix"
 08. "Le mal est fait"
 09. "C'est toujours 2 connards dans un abribus"
 10. "Pas n'importe quel toon"
 11. "J'essaye, j'essaye"
 12. "Promenade imprévue"
 13. "Xavier"
 14. "Wondercash"
 15. "On est resté à l'hôtel"
 16. "Si facile"
 17. "Inachevés"
 18. "Quand on descend vers le centre"

2017

Orelsan – La fête est finie
 01. "San"
 02. "La fête est finie"
 03. "Basique"
 04. "Tout va bien" (co-produced with Stromae)
 05. "Défaite de famille" (co-produced with Phazz)
 06. "La lumière" (co-produced with Phazz)
 08. "Quand est-ce que ça s'arrête ?" (co-produced with Guillaume Brière)
 09. "Christophe" (co-produced with Phazz)
 10. "Zone"
 11. "Dans ma ville, on traîne" (co-produced with Phazz)
 14. "Notes pour trop tard"

2018

Orelsan – La fête est finie - Épilogue
 02. "Tout ce que je sais"
 03. "La famille, la famille"
 05. "Tout va bien (Remix)" (co-produced with Stromae)
 06. "Discipline"
 09. "Dis-moi" (co-produced with Phazz)
 10. "Rêves bizarres"
 11. "Épilogue"
 12. "San"
 13. "La fête est finie"
 14. "Basique"
 15. "Tout va bien" (co-produced with Stromae)
 16. "Défaite de famille" (co-produced with Phazz)
 17. "La lumière" (co-produced with Phazz)
 19. "Quand est-ce que ça s'arrête ?" (co-produced with Guillaume Brière)
 20. "Christophe" (co-produced with Phazz)
 21. "Zone"
 22. "Dans ma ville, on traîne" (co-produced with Phazz)
 25. "Notes pour trop tard"

References

External links
 
 
 

 
 
Discographies of French artists
Hip hop discographies
Rhythm and blues discographies
Production discographies